Jordanstown railway station serves Jordanstown and the University of Ulster in Newtownabbey, Northern Ireland. A park and ride facility for the station has been proposed to ease congestion on the main Jordanstown Road.

The station was opened on 1 February 1853. The station buildings were demolished in the 1980s and replaced by modest shelters. Prior to this, the station was staffed permanently and had a manually operated level crossing. Today, the level crossing is automatic, and the station is only staffed on the Belfast-bound platform at peak times.

Service

On Saturdays, the service remains half-hourly, with fewer trains at peak times.

On Sundays, the service reduces to hourly operation in both directions.

References

Railway stations in County Antrim
Railway stations opened in 1853
Railway stations served by NI Railways
Newtownabbey
Railway stations in Northern Ireland opened in 1853